is a Japanese lyricist who has written the lyrics for several tokusatsu television series' theme songs. Most recently, Fujibayashi has worked with Shuhei Naruse on the soundtracks of Kamen Rider Den-O, Kamen Rider Kiva, and their films. She has also worked with Nana Mizuki, May'n, BoA, Ken Hirai, Sowelu, 2PM, Mikuni Shimokawa, Crystal Kay, Beni Arashiro, Daisuke Hasegawa, Issa of Da Pump, Lead, and Miho Kanno.

List of songs written by Shoko Fujibayashi

References

External links
Fantas.biz - Fujibayashi's official website

1972 births
Living people
Japanese lyricists
Musicians from Yamagata Prefecture
People from Yamagata (city)